Sergeant Slavika Tomitch was a Serbian Girl of 17 who joined the Serbian Army Battalion of Major Wajo Tankositch. The Austro-Hungarian Empire blamed Wajo Tankositch as one of those responsible assassination of Archduke Franz Ferdinand. For actions during the Serbian army's retreat through Albania (winter 1915–16).   Tomitch was decorated with the military medal.

See also
Milunka Savić
Antonija Javornik
Flora Sandes
Leslie Joy Whitehead
Women in the military
Sofija Jovanović

Bibliography 
Notes

References 
  
 
  

 
 
Female wartime cross-dressers
Serbian military personnel of World War I
Serbian soldiers
Serbian women
Serbian women in World War I
Women soldiers 
Royal Serbian Army soldiers
19th-century Serbian women
20th-century Serbian people
20th-century Serbian women